DAT is a Kazakh newspaper. Along with Altyn Tamyr and Tortinshi Bilik, it is an opposition news source. The newspaper fell into difficulties during the November 2012 case against media sources in Kazakhstan; its website dat.kz as of December 2012 is inaccessible. Ularbek Baitailaq, an archivist of the  Kazakh National Archive, has contributed articles to the resource.

References

See also
Media of Kazakhstan

Newspapers published in Kazakhstan
Kazakh-language newspapers